The sixth season of the American television series Legends of Tomorrow, which is based on characters from DC Comics, premiered on The CW on  May 2, 2021, and consisted of 15 episodes. It is set in the Arrowverse, sharing continuity with the other television series of the universe, and is a spin-off of Arrow and The Flash. The season was produced by Berlanti Productions, Warner Bros. Television, and DC Entertainment, with Phil Klemmer and Keto Shimizu serving as showrunners.

The season was ordered in January 2020. Production began that October and concluded in May 2021. Principal cast members Caity Lotz, Tala Ashe, Jes Macallan, Olivia Swann, Amy Louise Pemberton, Nick Zano, Dominic Purcell and Matt Ryan return from previous seasons, while Adam Tsekhman and Shayan Sobhian were promoted to the main cast from their recurring status in previous seasons. They are joined by new cast member Lisseth Chavez.

Episodes

Cast and characters

Main 
 Caity Lotz as Sara Lance / White Canary
 Tala Ashe as Zari Tomaz and Zari Tarazi
 Jes Macallan as Ava Sharpe
 Olivia Swann as Astra Logue
 Adam Tsekhman as Gary Green
 Shayan Sobhian as Behrad Tarazi
 Lisseth Chavez as Esperanza "Spooner" Cruz
 Amy Louise Pemberton as Gideon
 Nick Zano as Nate Heywood / Steel
 Dominic Purcell as Mick Rory / Heat Wave
 Matt Ryan as John Constantine

Recurring 
 Raffi Barsoumian as Bishop
 Aliyah O'Brien as Kayla

Guest 

Cast notes

Production

Development 
In January 2020, The CW renewed the series for a sixth season. Keto Shimizu and Phil Klemmer return as showrunners.

Writing 
In February 2020, Klemmer said the theme of season six would be one that the writers had since the first season, but declined to reveal what it was. It was later revealed that the season would involve aliens. Regarding the decision to make aliens the villains of the season, Klemmer said this was to differentiate them from previous villains. He added, "To think about little green men with laser guns who just want to rule the world, you know, Marvin the Martian kinda shape, you're like, "Yes, that's what we need!" Not having to understand who our villains are on any kind of emotional scale means we can focus on the emotional stories of our characters". The fifth season ended with Sara Lance being abducted by aliens. According to an interview with Klemmer, the season will feature a "motley assortment" of aliens, and will focus on the team attempting to rescue Sara, as well as Sara's experiences in outer space.

Casting 
Main cast members Caity Lotz, Tala Ashe, Jes Macallan, Olivia Swann, Amy Louise Pemberton, Nick Zano, Dominic Purcell, and Matt Ryan return as Sara Lance / White Canary, Zari Tarazi, Ava Sharpe, Astra Logue, Gideon, Nate Heywood / Steel, Mick Rory / Heat Wave, and John Constantine. Shayan Sobhian, who recurred as Behrad Tarazi in season five, was promoted to series regular with this season. Maisie Richardson-Sellers, who had been a regular since season two, left the series ahead of season six in order to "make her mark as a filmmaker on her own", though she does appear through archive footage in the seventh episode. In September 2020, Lisseth Chavez joined the main cast as an original character named Esperanza "Spooner" Cruz. The following month, Adam Tsekhman, who recurred as Gary Green since the third season, was promoted to the main cast. In December 2020, David Ramsey, who portrayed John Diggle in the Arrowverse, was revealed to be appearing in the season in an undisclosed role. In January 2021, Aliyah O'Brien was cast in a recurring role for the sixth season. On April 17, 2021, Purcell announced he would be leaving the series after the sixth season, but will return periodically in the seventh season. On July 25, 2021, it was announced that the sixth season would be the last for Ryan to portray John Constantine (though he will portray a new character in the seventh season). Tala Ashe also portrayed Zari Tomaz who returned in a recurring capacity.

Filming 
Principal photography for the sixth season was scheduled to begin on October 5, 2020, in Burnaby, British Columbia. However, by September 29, the start of filming was indefinitely delayed, because of delays in receiving COVID-19 test results for the cast and crew. Filming ultimately began on October 8, and concluded on May 8, 2021.

Marketing 
In early August 2020, The CW released several posters of the Arrowverse superheroes wearing face masks, including White Canary and Beebo, with all posters having the caption "Real Heroes Wear Masks". This marketing tactic was used to "raise public awareness on the efficacy of facial coverings preventing the spread of COVID-19".

Release 
The season premiered on May 2, 2021, consisting of 15 episodes.

Reception

References 

2021 American television seasons
Legends of Tomorrow seasons
Television productions postponed due to the COVID-19 pandemic